Accept Your Own and Be Yourself (The Black Album) is the only full-length album released under producer No I.D.'s name. It was put out by Relativity Records in 1997.

Production is done entirely by him, except "Original Man" (co-produced by Dug Infinite), "Sky's the Limit (Inf Mix)" (produced by Dug Infinite) and "Sky's the Limit" (co-produced by Spike Rebel). He raps on most of the tracks; Dug Infinite is also featured on most of them. Common and Syndicate also make appearances.

Track listing

Samples
"State To State"
"The School Boy" by David Axelrod
"My Adidas" by Run DMC
"Mega Live (That's the Joint)"
"You're Welcome, Stop on By" by Ahmad Jamal
"Suspect" by Nas
"1,2 Sh*t" by A Tribe Called Quest
"Pray for the Sinners"
"Take A Little Trip" by Minnie Riperton
"Fate or Destiny"
"Merlin's Prophecy" by David Axelrod
"Gem"
"Aire" by Chicago
"Sky's The Limit (Inf Mix)"
"Anya" by Richard Rodney Bennett
"Keep On" by D-Train
"The Real Weight"
"Woman of the Ghetto" by Marlena Shaw
"Bumpin' Bus Stop" by Thunder and Lightning
"Two Steps Behind"
"Don't Let Up" by Olympic Runners

Album singles

Chart positions

References

1997 debut albums
Relativity Records albums
No I.D. albums
Albums produced by No I.D.